Dennis Ferrer (born December 26 1970) is a New York-based DJ, producer and remixer. He currently resides in Union City, New Jersey. A veteran of soulful house music production, he has worked with the likes of Masters at Work (MAW), Little Louie Vega, the Martinez Brothers and many other notable New York producers and DJs. Ferrer is also the founder of the Objektivity record label. In 2010 He releases his most famous single "Hey Hey" on Defected Records

Discography
 The World as I See It (2006)

Singles
" Touch The Sky (feat. Mia Tuttaville) (2007)
“Hey Hey” (2010)
"Sunny Days" (feat. Dawn Tallman) (2020)

Remixes
 2007 Fish Go Deep - The Cure And The Cause (Dennis Ferrer Remix)
 2008 The Sunburst Band - Journey To The Sun (Dennis Ferrer Remix)
 2008 Don't Believe in Love (Dennis Ferrer Objektivity Mix) (nominated to the Grammy Award for Best Remixed Recording, Non-Classical).
 2012 Nick Curly - Underground (Dennis Ferrer Remix)
 2014 London Grammar - Sights (Dennis Ferrer Remix)
 2015 Sabb - One Of Us feat. Forrest (Dennis Ferrer Remix) 
 2015 Hot Chip - "Need You Now" (Dennis Ferrer Remix) 
 2018 Nasser Baker - Say Something (Dennis Ferrer Remix)
 2018 Nic Fanciulli - "Imitations" (Dennis Ferrer Remix)
 2019 Simon Harris - feat. Morrison - This is Serious (Dennis Ferrer Remix)

References

External links
Ferrer profile at Objektivity
Profile at Defected Records
Dennis Ferrer on Myspace

Dennis Ferrer at Discogs

1970 births
American DJs
DJs from New York City
American house musicians
Living people
Electronic dance music DJs